IVG may refer to:

 In vitro gametogenesis
Illinois Veteran Grant
IVG Immobilien
Berane Airport, IATA code IVG (as the city was formerly known as Ivangrad)
Abortion, in languages such as French, Italian, and Portuguese where "voluntary interruption of pregnancy" translates with this abbreviation